Kamila Wozniakowska  (born 18 July 1956) is a Polish-Canadian Postwar & Contemporary painter whose work "blends the narrative aspects of 18th century engravings, appropriation art techniques, and repetition."

Early life and studies 
Wozniakowska was born in Warsaw, Poland in 1956. She studied painting in France before emigrating to Montreal, Quebec, Canada. After emigrated to Canada, she graduated from Université du Québec in Montreal obtaining the degree of Baccalauréat en arts plastiques under Prof Raymond Lavoie in 1986 and Maîtrise en arts plastiques under Prof. Louise Poissant in 1996.

Her art is primarily influenced by the 1970s.

Art career 
Wozniakowska was commissioned in the late 1990s to decorate the theatre of the new Maison Théâtre in Montreal. Wozniakowska's work in the theatre "reunites the traditional with the modern"

In 2007, Wozniakowska was inducted into the Royal Canadian Academy of Arts.

Styles and influences 
Wozniakowska's painting reveals a fascination for communication and the complexity of human relations. It is an examination of the transmission and interpretation of the narrative in particular and the narrative power of the image in general. Through whimsical and often humorous scenes which allow many possible levels of interpretation, these paintings reveal the dramatic gap between our own life experience and what remains of it in the records left for posterity.

Collections
Wozniakowska's 1996 painting The Changing of the Guard is currently held in the permanent collection of the Musée national des beaux-arts du Québec in Quebec.

Wozniakowska's 2010 painting Jenny 2009 painting Katechizm rewolucjonisty are also currently held in the permanent collection of the Galeria Bielska in Bielsko-Biała, Poland.

In 2011, Concordia University commissioned Wozniakowska to create the piece Acer Concordia, a series of 26 metal panels engraved with maple trees. These panels are located in the Guy-Concordia metro station. These panels are supposed to represent "the university’s growth from fragile sapling to a strong, vibrant part of the city’s landscape."

Exhibitions 
06 Feb 2004 - 18 Apr 2004 - Solo Show at Musée d'art contemporain de Montréal 

26 Oct, 2012 - 30 Nov, 2012 - Weird Science at Richard Levy Gallery

References

1956 births
Artists from Montreal
Artists from Warsaw
Canadian women painters
Living people
Canadian people of Polish descent
Canadian painters
21st-century Canadian women artists
Members of the Royal Canadian Academy of Arts